Josh Stewart (born 1977) is an American actor.

Josh Stewart may also refer to:
 Josh Stewart (baseball) (born 1978), former Major League Baseball pitcher
 Josh Stewart (American football) (born 1992), American football wide receiver who most recently played for the Wichita Falls Nighthawks 
 Josh Stewart (wide receiver, born 1994), American football wide receiver for the San Antonio Commanders

See also
 Stewart (name)
 Stewart (disambiguation)